Cheran Chozhan Pandian is a 1998 Indian Tamil language comedy film directed by Senthamizhan, who had previously directed the film Sindhu Nathi Poo (1994). The film stars Ranjith, Anand Babu and Vadivelu. It was released on 25 December 1998.

Plot

Cheran (Ranjith), Chozhan (Anand Babu) and Pandian (Vadivelu) are arrested for different crimes and they are immediately released by a kind-hearted police officer (Mansoor Ali Khan). The three men decide to become good persons but they cross a corrupted politician's path named Swamy (Vasu Vikram). The three friends fall in love with Gayathri (Mohini), Swamy's sister, who becomes their close friend.

Cast

Ranjith as Cheran
Anand Babu as Chozhan
Vadivelu as Pandian
Mohini as Gayathri
Lashmipathiraj as Krishna
Mansoor Ali Khan
Vasu Vikram as Swamy
Junior Balaiah
Oru Viral Krishna Rao as Vanagamudi
Madhan Bob
S. R. Veeraraghavan
Chitti Babu
Thavakkalai
Alphonsa
Shakeela

Soundtrack

The film score and the soundtrack were composed by Soundaryan. The soundtrack, released in 1998, features 5 tracks with lyrics written by Alamelu Muthulingam.

References

1998 films
1998 comedy films
Indian comedy films
1990s Tamil-language films